Neue Oper Wien is an Austrian opera company based in Vienna. Insight Guides cites them and the Wiener Taschenoper as "two of the independent groups which perform exclusively 20th and 21st-century opera".

Operas performed, 1992–2014 
 1992: Musiktheater-Keimzellen (World premiere)
 1994: Axel Seidelmann: Hiob (World premiere)
 1995: Reinhard Süss/Oskar Kokoschka: Sphinx und Strohmann (World premiere)
 1995: Kurt Weill: Der Silbersee
 1996: Benjamin Britten: Billy Budd and Mark-Anthony Turnage: Greek
 1997: Max Brand: Maschinist Hopkins
 1999: Tan Dun: Marco Polo
 2000: Dirk D'Ase: Arrest (World premiere)
 2000: Leonard Bernstein: Candide
 2002: Kurt Weill: Johnny Johnson
 2003: Helmut Lachenmann: Das Mädchen mit den Schwefelhölzern
 2003: Wolfram Wagner/Peter Turrini: Endlich Schluss (World premiere)
 2004: Christoph Coburger nach Daniil Charms: Zwischenfälle (World premiere)
 2004: John Casken: God’s Liar
 2005: Péter Eötvös: Le Balcon // Michael Tippett: The Knot Garden
 2005: Christoph Cech – Claudio Monteverdi: Orfeo (World premiere)
 2006: Richard Dünser/Thomas Höft: Radek (World premiere)
 2006: Erik Hojsgaard nach Ödön von Horváth: Don Juan kommt aus dem Krieg (World premiere)
 2006: Dieter Kaufmann nach Josef Winkler: Requiem für Piccoletto (World premiere)
 2006: Thomas Pernes/Gloria G.: Zauberflöte06 (World premiere)
 2007: Tan Dun: Tea
 2008: Elliott Carter: What next? // Detlev Glanert: Scherz, Satire, Ironie und tiefere Bedeutung
 2008: Isidora Zebeljan: Eine Marathon-Familie (World premiere)
 2008: Dieter Kaufmann/Elfriede Jelinek: FUGE – UNFUG – E (World premiere)
 2009: Harrison Birtwistle: The Last Supper
 2010: Herwig Reiter/Peter Turrini: Campiello (World premiere)
 2012: Markus Lehmann-Horn / Michael Schneider: Woyzeck 2.0 – Traumfalle (World premiere)
 2013: Šimon Voseček: Biedermann und die Brandstifter (World premiere)
 2013: Péter Eötvös: "Paradise reloaded (Lilith)" (World premiere)
 2014: Harrison Birtwistle: Punch and Judy
 2014: Manfred Trojahn: Orest

References

External links 

Austrian choirs
Austrian opera companies
Organisations based in Vienna
Musical groups from Vienna